The 2011 ECAC Hockey Men's Ice Hockey Tournament was played between March 4 and March 19, 2011 at campus locations and at the Boardwalk Hall in Atlantic City, New Jersey, United States. Yale won its second ECAC Hockey Men's Ice Hockey Tournament and received ECAC Hockey's automatic bid to the 2011 NCAA Division I Men's Ice Hockey Tournament.

Format
The tournament features four rounds of play. In the first round, the fifth and twelfth, sixth and eleventh, seventh and tenth, and eighth and ninth seeds as determined by the final regular season standings play a best-of-three series, with the winner advancing to the quarterfinals. There, the first seed and lowest-ranked first-round winner, the second seed and second-lowest-ranked first-round winner, the third seed and second-highest-ranked first-round winner, and the fourth seed and highest-ranked first-round winner play a best-of-three series, with the winner advancing to the semifinals. In the semifinals, the highest and lowest seeds and second-highest and second-lowest seeds play a single game, with the winner advancing to the championship game and the loser advancing to the third-place game. The tournament champion receives an automatic bid to the 2011 NCAA Men's Division I Ice Hockey Tournament.

Regular season standings
Note: GP = Games played; W = Wins; L = Losses; T = Ties; PTS = Points; GF = Goals For; GA = Goals Against

Bracket

Note: * denotes overtime period(s)

First round

(5) Rensselaer  vs. (12) Colgate

(6) Princeton  vs. (11) St. Lawrence

(7) Clarkson  vs. (10) Harvard

(8) Quinnipiac  vs. (9) Brown

Quarterfinals

(1) Union vs. (12) Colgate

(2) Yale vs. (11) St. Lawrence

(3) Dartmouth vs. (10) Harvard

(4) Cornell vs. (8) Quinnipiac

Semifinals

(2) Yale vs. (12) Colgate

(3) Dartmouth vs. (4) Cornell

3rd Place Game

(3) Dartmouth vs. (12) Colgate

Championship

(2) Yale vs. (4) Cornell

Tournament awards

All-Tournament Team
F Chris Cahill (Yale)
F Andrew Miller (Yale)
F Brian O’Neill (Yale)
D Connor Goggin (Dartmouth)
D Jimmy Martin (Yale)
G Ryan Rondeau* (Yale)
* Most Outstanding Player(s)

References

External links
2011 ECAC Hockey Men's Ice Hockey Tournament

ECAC Tournament
ECAC Hockey Men's Ice Hockey Tournament